All Stars Osvajači (trans. "All Stars Conquerors") is a Serbian rock/pop band. Because its founder was former Osvajači frontman Zvonko Pantović, the band was during the 1999 - 2003 period typically referred to as just "Osvajači", which caused confusion among fans.

Discography

Studio albums
Krv i led (1990)
Sam (1995)
Vino crveno (1999)
Nevera (2000)
Crno oko (2002)
Sad je na mene red (2015)

References 
EX YU ROCK enciklopedija 1960-2006, Janjatović Petar;

See also
 Osvajači

Serbian pop music groups
Musical groups from Belgrade